Falcon Ridge Folk Festival, Hillsdale, NY - July 21st, 2006 is a live recording of Gandalf Murphy and the Slambovian Circus of Dreams' mainstage set at the 2006 Falcon Ridge Folk Festival. 

This is single disc which contains the full set both songs and introductions.

This is a "Bootleg Series" album which is generally only available for sale at live shows.

Track listing

"Intro" – 0:35
"Desire" – 6:52
"Yodel Song" – 6:48
"Flapjacks from the Sky" – 8:59
"Light a Way" – 4:38
"Sullivan Lane" – 4:25
"Her Own World" – 5:40
"Talkin' to the Buddha" – 10:27
"Alice in Space" - 6:34

See also
 

Gandalf Murphy and the Slambovian Circus of Dreams albums
2007 live albums